Noel Magee (born 16 December 1965) is an Irish former professional boxer who competed from 1985 to 1997. He held the Commonwealth light heavyweight title in 1995.

Background
Magee grew up in the strongly nationalist Ardoyne area of Belfast and came from a boxing obsessed family. Magee's younger brother Eamonn stated that for his mother "boxing was as important as school". Magee's three brothers were also boxers with two of them, Eamonn and Terry, having careers as professional boxers. His brother, Eamonn, was also a Commonwealth champion.

Amateur career
Magee, like his younger brother Eamonn, boxed to national level for Ireland. The highlight of his short amateur career was in 1985 when, at the age of eighteen, he won the Irish Light Heavyweight Title, defeating a young Steve Collins in the final. Magee again beat Collins later that year in a trial for the international team.

Professional career
Still only 19 years of age, Magee on 22 May 1985, turned professional under the mentorship of Pat Brogan, winning his first fight at the European Sporting Club, Stoke, England, in which Magee knocked out Nigel Prickett.

Title fight defeats
It was four years before he fought for his title fight when he took on fellow Belfastman Sam Storey in November 1989 for the British Super Middleweight Title, however he lost this fight when the referee stopped the fight in the 9th round. After this loss Noel changed managers and joined the Eastwood stable. Magee went on a winning streak beating his next seven opponents, before he again fought for another this time the British Light Heavyweight Title against Maurice Core in August 1992 but the result was the same, Magee, was stopped in the ninth despite having Core down twice in 3 rounds up going into the 9th. Magee's following fight was also a defeat, this time at the hands of Dariusz Michalczewski for the Vacant IBF Inter-Continental Light Heavyweight Title. Magee also lost his challenge for the European (EBU) Light Heavyweight Title against Fabrice Tiozzo.

Commonwealth title victory
After this series of title fight defeats, Magee was becoming disillusioned with boxing and had informed his promoter Barney Eastwood that he was considering changing promoters.

The following week Eastwood lined up a fight with the then unbeaten Commonwealth Light Heavyweight Title holder Garry Delaney. The fight took place in May 1995 at the Festival Hall, Basildon, Essex, England. Magee was a huge underdog with the bookies offering odds of 10/1 for a Magee win. Magee made his superior hand and foot speed tell by winning the fight with a stoppage in the seventh to take the only major title belt in his professional career.

Magee lost the first defence of his title to Nicky Piper, and after this Magee lost his will to continue boxing and two years later, after a brief two fight comeback including a loss to Darren Corbett for the Irish Cruiserweight Title, Magee retired from boxing.

Professional boxing record

|-
|align="center" colspan=8|27 Wins (12 knockouts, 15 decisions), 8 Losses (7 knockout, 1 decision), 2 Draws 
|-
| align="center" style="border-style: none none solid solid; background: #e3e3e3"|Result
| align="center" style="border-style: none none solid solid; background: #e3e3e3"|Record
| align="center" style="border-style: none none solid solid; background: #e3e3e3"|Opponent
| align="center" style="border-style: none none solid solid; background: #e3e3e3"|Type
| align="center" style="border-style: none none solid solid; background: #e3e3e3"|Round
| align="center" style="border-style: none none solid solid; background: #e3e3e3"|Date
| align="center" style="border-style: none none solid solid; background: #e3e3e3"|Location
| align="center" style="border-style: none none solid solid; background: #e3e3e3"|Notes
|-align=center
|Loss
|
|align=left| Darren Corbett
|KO
|2
|29 April 1997
|align=left| Belfast, Northern Ireland
|align=left|
|-
|Win
|
|align=left| John Duckworth
|PTS
|6
|28 January 1997
|align=left| Belfast, Northern Ireland
|align=left|
|-
|Loss
|
|align=left| Nicky Piper
|KO
|9
|30 September 1995
|align=left| Cardiff, Wales
|align=left|
|-
|Win
|
|align=left| Garry Delaney
|TKO
|7
|9 May 1995
|align=left| Basildon, England
|align=left|
|-
|Loss
|
|align=left| Fabrice Tiozzo
|TKO
|4
|5 March 1995
|align=left| Vitrolles, France
|align=left|
|-
|Win
|
|align=left| John J. Cooke
|PTS
|6
|21 May 1994
|align=left| Belfast, Northern Ireland
|align=left|
|-
|Win
|
|align=left| John Kaighin
|PTS
|6
|16 October 1993
|align=left| Belfast, Northern Ireland
|align=left|
|-
|Loss
|
|align=left| Dariusz Michalczewski
|TKO
|8
|22 May 1993
|align=left| Aachen, Germany
|align=left|
|-
|Loss
|
|align=left| Maurice Core
|TKO
|9
|28 September 1992
|align=left| Manchester, England
|align=left|
|-
|Win
|
|align=left| Roger McKenzie
|PTS
|8
|25 April 1992
|align=left| Belfast, Northern Ireland
|align=left|
|-
|Win
|
|align=left| Tony Wilson
|TKO
|3
|11 December 1991
|align=left| Dublin, Ireland
|align=left|
|-
|Win
|
|align=left| Frank Minton
|TKO
|3
|13 November 1991
|align=left| Belfast, Northern Ireland
|align=left|
|-
|Win
|
|align=left| Simon Collins
|PTS
|8
|11 May 1991
|align=left| Belfast, Northern Ireland
|align=left|
|-
|Win
|
|align=left| Roger McKenzie
|PTS
|6
|12 February 1991
|align=left| Belfast, Northern Ireland
|align=left|
|-
|Win
|
|align=left| Johnny Melfah
|PTS
|6
|30 October 1990
|align=left| Belfast, Northern Ireland
|align=left|
|-
|Win
|
|align=left| Glazz Campbell
|PTS
|8
|15 September 1990
|align=left| Belfast, Northern Ireland
|align=left|
|-
|Loss
|
|align=left| Sam Storey
|TKO
|9
|29 November 1989
|align=left| Belfast, Northern Ireland
|align=left|
|-
|Win
|
|align=left| Paul McCarthy
|KO
|2
|2 October 1989
|align=left| Hanley, England
|align=left|
|-
|Loss
|
|align=left| Yves Monsieur
|TKO
|5
|15 February 1989
|align=left| Stoke-on-Trent, England
|align=left|
|-
|Draw
|
|align=left| Ian Bulloch
|PTS
|10
|15 November 1988
|align=left| Kingston upon Hull, England
|align=left|
|-
|Win
|
|align=left| Mike Brothers
|TKO
|6
|3 May 1988
|align=left| Stoke-on-Trent, England
|align=left|
|-
|Draw
|
|align=left| Rufino Angulo
|PTS
|8
|13 February 1988
|align=left| Paris, France
|align=left|
|-
|Loss
|
|align=left| John Held
|PTS
|8
|20 October 1987
|align=left| Kingston upon Hull, England
|align=left|
|-
|Win
|
|align=left| Jimmy Ellis
|TKO
|6
|3 August 1987
|align=left| Stoke-on-Trent, England
|align=left|
|-
|Win
|
|align=left| Lennie Howard
|TKO
|1
|24 February 1987
|align=left| Ilford, England
|align=left|
|-
|Win
|
|align=left| Serg Fame
|PTS
|8
|17 November 1986
|align=left| London, England
|align=left|
|-
|Win
|
|align=left| Jimmy Ellis
|PTS
|8
|13 October 1986
|align=left| London, England
|align=left|
|-
|Win
|
|align=left| Geoff Rymer
|KO
|1
|30 May 1986
|align=left| Stoke-on-Trent, England
|align=left|
|-
|Win
|
|align=left| Barry Ahmed
|TKO
|7
|23 April 1986
|align=left| Stoke-on-Trent, England
|align=left|
|-
|Win
|
|align=left| Winston Burnett
|PTS
|8
|5 March 1986
|align=left| Stoke-on-Trent, England
|align=left|
|-
|Win
|
|align=left| Barry Ahmed
|PTS
|8
|20 February 1986
|align=left| Newcastle upon Tyne, England
|align=left|
|-
|Win
|
|align=left| Blaine Logsdon
|PTS
|8
|23 January 1986
|align=left| Stoke-on-Trent, England
|align=left|
|-
|Win
|
|align=left| Winston Burnett
|PTS
|8
|11 December 1985
|align=left| Stoke-on-Trent, England
|align=left|
|-
|Win
|
|align=left| Winston Burnett
|PTS
|8
|6 November 1985
|align=left| Nantwich, England
|align=left|
|-
|Win
|
|align=left| Eddie Chatterton
|TKO
|1
|28 October 1985
|align=left| Stoke-on-Trent, England
|align=left|
|-
|Win
|
|align=left| Dave Furneaux
|TKO
|3
|12 September 1985
|align=left| Swindon, England
|align=left|
|-
|Win
|
|align=left| Nigel Prickett
|KO
|1
|22 May 1985
|align=left| Stoke-on-Trent, England
|align=left|
|}

References

External links
 

1965 births
Living people
Boxers from Belfast
Male boxers from Northern Ireland
Irish male boxers
Light-heavyweight boxers